Hon Makmot Edward Otto (born 2 August 1978) is a Ugandan-Canadian barrister, solicitor, notary public and an Advocate of Uganda Law Society & East African Law Society, lawyer and politician. He served in 10th the elected Member of 10th
 Parliament for Agago County. He his an independent candidate. He succeeded John Okot Amos, who was preceded by the former Leader of Opposition Professor Ogenga Latigo and Chief Justice Owiny Dollo. He served as the vice chairperson of the Committee on Rules, Privileges And Discipline and a member of the Legal and Parliamentary Affairs Committee in the 10th Parliament.

Otto is the founder of Otto, Barrister, Solicitor and Notary and a partner M/s Otto, Barrister, Solicitor & Notart and co-founder of Otto & Sherman Professional Corporation, a Canadian law firm. He is a believer in Access to Justice for low income people and as such serves as a panel member for the Legal Aid Ontario.  He is a member of the Law Society of Upper Canada, Canadian Association of Black Lawyers, Canadian/Ontario Bar Association, York Regional Law Association and the Advocates' Circle.

Otto served as a secretary on the board of trustees of the Ugandan North American Association from 2015 to 2017. He was a cabinet minister in charge of production for the 2001/2002 Makerere University Guild Government, a child delegate to the constituent assembly for the children of Masaka District in 1994, a speaker of Agago Students Association in 1998/1999, a deputy speaker of Nsibirwa Hall in 2000/2001, a returning officer for Acholi Makerere Students Association (AMSA) in 2001, an editor current affairs for St. Mary's College Kisubi (SMACK) in 1996, a junior debating club chairperson and junior head-boy at St. Henry's College Kitovu (SHACK).

Early life and education
Otto was born in Agago District, Acholi sub-region, on 2 August 1978. The son of Mzee Aldo Davidson Otto and Veronica Adong Otto, he was raised in a Catholic family of the Acholi. He started his childhood education at Patongo Primary school, proceeded to Adilang Primary School in Agago District then joined Bishop Angelo Negri Primary School in Gulu, Northern Uganda. His primary education was interrupted by the Lord's Resistance Army insurgency in the region at the time and so was forced to flee to Kampala, Uganda's capital city, where he sat his primary leaving examinations at Bat Valley Primary school.

Otto attained his O-Level academic qualifications from St. Henry's College Kitovu where he was both a junior debating club chairperson and a junior head-boy and was also a child delegate that represented Masaka District at the National Conference Center during the making of the 1995 Constitution of Uganda. He attended St. Mary's College Kisubi for A-Level education where he also served as the editor current affairs for the college's flagship publication, the Eagle Magazine.

Otto further advanced to Makerere University (MUK) for his university education where he attained a Bachelor of Laws degree in 2002. At MUK, he was a cabinet minister in charge of production for the Makerere University Student Government of 2001/2002 and a representative of Nsibirwa Hall to the Makerere University Student Parliament in 2001/2002. Otto was the deputy speaker of Nsibrwa Hall in 2000/2001. Makmot also attended University of Toronto and attained a Doctor of Jurisprudence degree in 2008. At the Canadian university, he served as an associate editor of the Journal of International Law and International Relations (JILIR) and played soccer for the University of Toronto, Faculty of Law soccer team.

Career
After attaining his bachelors at Makerere University in 2002, Otto was employed as a case worker at Downtown Legal Services, a community legal clinic and a clinical education program, operated by the Faculty of Law at the University of Toronto. This was until 2005 when he enrolled for further studies at the Canadian university. Otto was admitted to the Bar program in the Province of Ontario, Canada after attaining a JD from University of Toronto.

He was duly sworn and enrolled as a solicitor for the Court of Appeal for Ontario, and duly called to the degree of Barrister-at- Law and was admitted to the practice at the Bar of Her Majesty Courts in Ontario, Canada by the benchers of The Law Society of Upper Canada on 15 June 2010. Otto articled with HOUSEN, Barrister, Solicitor and Notary then worked as a client service representative for Legal Aid Ontario in 2010 before founding Otto, Barrister, Solicitor and Notary where he worked as a barrister and solicitor until 2015. He is also a partner and co-founder of Otto & Sherman Professional Corporation where he still serves to date.

In 2015, Otto joined elective politics and went on to win the parliamentary seat for Agago County as an independent or non-partisan member of parliament in the 2016 general elections that ushered in the 10th Parliament for the Pearl of Africa.

In the 10th Parliament, Otto serves on the Committee on Rules, Privileges and Discipline and the Legal and Parliamentary Affairs Committee. He is the general secretary of independents or non-partisan members of parliament, a member of: the Forum for Quality Health; the Legal and Leadership Forum; the Forum for Environment; the Acholi Parliamentary Group and; the Uganda Parliamentary Prayer Breakfast Fellowship.

Personal details
Makmot Edward Otto is married to Dr. Josephine Okwera Otto, a Director,Health and Social Services with Uganda Redcross. They have three children; Elizabeth Veronica Otto, Esther Teresa Otto and Megan Hannah Otto.

See also
Agago District

References

External links
 Website of the Parliament of Uganda
 York Regional Law Association website
 Canadian Association of Black Lawyers website

Living people
1978 births
Members of the Parliament of Uganda
Makerere University alumni
People from Northern Region, Uganda
Active politicians
21st-century Ugandan politicians